Montana Highway 2 (MT 2) is a  state highway in the southern part of the U.S. state of Montana. It extends from Interstate 15 (I-15) and I-90 in Butte to I-90 in Three Forks. Previously, this roadway was a part of U.S. Route 10 (US 10).

Route description
MT 2 begins in Butte at an interchange with I-15 and I-90, which travel concurrently through the city. The highway heads south and then southeast through rural Silver Bow and Jefferson Counties. It travels through Whitehall and Cardwell. Just west of Three Forks, MT 2 splits away from US 287 and then enters the city. The highway ends at another interchange with I-90; the roadway continues as Secondary Highway 205 (S-205).

Major intersections

See also

References

External links

002
U.S. Route 10
Transportation in Silver Bow County, Montana
Transportation in Jefferson County, Montana
Transportation in Broadwater County, Montana
Transportation in Gallatin County, Montana
Buildings and structures in Butte, Montana